"Rakata" is the debut single by Puerto Rican reggaeton duo Wisin & Yandel, released on January 27, 2005, by Machete Music. It is from the Luny Tunes-produced compilation Mas Flow 2, and was later included on Wisin & Yandel's fifth studio album Pa'l Mundo. The song was produced by Luny Tunes and Nely "El Arma Secreta". It is known to be one of their signature songs, as well as being their first major-charting single. Since the single's release, it has become one of the top-selling singles of 2005 and 2006 during the mainstream success years of reggaeton music. It was nominated for Best Latin/Reggaetón Track at the 22nd Annual International Dance Music Awards in 2007, which was ultimately won by Shakira and Wyclef Jean for their number one single "Hips Don't Lie".

Music video

The music video, directed by Marlon Peña, was released in late 2005 by Universal Music Group and Mas Flow Inc. Typical of the time during which reggaeton was beginning to get mainstream success, the video mainly showed the duo and a group of dancing women in a large crowd of people. Luny from the production duo makes a cameo appearance in the video as well.

Chart performance
Since the single's release, it has become one of the top-selling singles of the end of 2005 and the beginning of 2006. It debuted on the Billboard Hot 100 at number 97, and peaked at number 85, becoming one of the first few reggaeton singles to chart on the Hot 100. It was also a major success on the Billboard Hot 100 Airplay chart, peaking at number 60. It was even a success on the U.S. Billboard Hot Latin Songs chart, peaking at number two, where he entered into force on November 3, 2005, and was like seven non-consecutive weeks, blocking him with "La Tortura" of Shakira feat. Alejandro Sanz , and "Rompe" by Daddy Yankee. The single had also made international success, peaking at number 15 on the Portuguese Singles Chart.

Track listings and formats
US CD single
 "Rakata"  – 2:55
 "Rakata"  – 3:33
 "Rakata"  – 3:24
 "Rakata"  – 4:05
 "Rakata"  – 2:55
 "Rakata"  – 3:21

European 12-inch vinyl
A1: "Rakata" 
A2: "Rakata" 
B1: "Rakata"

Official versions
Album Version – 2:55
Remix – 3:33
Hip Hop Remix – 3:24
Tigerstyle Remix – 4:05
Instrumental – 2:55
Hip Hop Remix A capella – 3:21

Charts

References

2005 debut singles
Wisin & Yandel songs
Song recordings produced by Luny Tunes
2005 songs
Machete Music singles
Songs written by Yandel
Songs written by Wisin